Carl Joseph Robie III (May 12, 1945 – November 29, 2011) was an American swimmer, Olympic champion, and former world record-holder.

Biography
At the 1964 Summer Olympics in Tokyo, Japan, Robie received a silver medal for his second-place finish in the men's 200-meter butterfly. Four years later at the 1968 Summer Olympics in Mexico City, he won a gold medal for winning the men's 200-meter butterfly. Robie broke the world record in men's 200-meter butterfly four times during his career, including twice on the same day in August 1962.

Robie practiced civil trial law in Sarasota, Florida.  He was inducted in the International Swimming Hall of Fame as an "Honor Swimmer" in 1976.

Death
Robie died at the age of 66 on November 29, 2011.

See also
 List of members of the International Swimming Hall of Fame
 List of Olympic medalists in swimming (men)
 List of University of Michigan alumni
 World record progression 200 metres butterfly

References

External links
 
 
 

1945 births
2011 deaths
Peekskill Military Academy alumni
American male butterfly swimmers
American male freestyle swimmers
Florida lawyers
World record setters in swimming
Michigan Wolverines men's swimmers
Olympic gold medalists for the United States in swimming
Olympic silver medalists for the United States in swimming
People from Delaware County, Pennsylvania
Sportspeople from Pennsylvania
Swimmers at the 1963 Pan American Games
Swimmers at the 1964 Summer Olympics
Swimmers at the 1968 Summer Olympics
Medalists at the 1968 Summer Olympics
Medalists at the 1964 Summer Olympics
Pan American Games gold medalists for the United States
Pan American Games medalists in swimming
Universiade medalists in swimming
Universiade gold medalists for the United States
Universiade silver medalists for the United States
Medalists at the 1965 Summer Universiade
Medalists at the 1967 Summer Universiade
20th-century American lawyers
Medalists at the 1963 Pan American Games